The Ministry of Justice of the Republic Somaliland  administers the court system (with the exception of the Supreme Court) and has the authority to hire court personnel, allocate funds, and train, discipline or dismiss judicial officers. According to Articles 7 and 38 of the Organisation of the Judiciary Law, the ministry even compiles a panel of assessors on an annual basis for the regional courts. Additionally, the ministry is a member of the Judicial Commission. The current minister is Mustafe Mohamoud Ali

Responsibilities
More so, the objectives of the ministry are as follows per Article 105 of the Constitution:

 Uphold and promote the rule of law in Somaliland;
 Respect and promote the separation of powers as contemplated in the Constitution, whilst taking into account the normal checks and balances of governmental branches;
 Promote and maintain an effective, efficient, transparent and accountable criminal justice system;
 Coordinate, facilitate and promote the general provision of and access to legal services in Somaliland;
 Take leadership in coordinating the progressive realization of rights and freedoms contemplated in the Constitution;
 Cooperate and support other role players, whilst respecting their specific mandates and, where applicable, their independence.

List of ministers (2005-present)

See also 
 Justice ministry
 Politics of Somaliland

References 

Justice ministries
Government of Somaliland